Interchange Plus is the common name for a pricing structure for accepting credit card transactions by merchants. The Interchange fee is an important factor in determining the actual cost of accepting credit cards. Interchange pricing is what the Visa and MasterCard associations along with credit card issuing banks charge merchant account providers to process credit and debit card transactions. Merchant Account providers then charge a markup on interchange known as interchange plus pricing to process the transaction and provide customer service to the merchant accepting the credit or debit card payment. Interchange Plus pricing is known as the most honest and transparent form of pricing for merchants looking to accept credit cards. There are a lot of credit card processing companies that only offer interchange plus pricing.

In Europe, the most common commercial contract between a merchant and the bank (the acquiring bank) consists of a fixed commission percentage called the merchant service commission or MSC.

Based on characteristics such as volume, national/international traffic and risk, the acquirer negotiates a fixed MSC for all transactions with the merchant. This is called a blend rate because it blends in all different rates buying in one selling rate for the acquiring bank. Calculated in the blend rate is an insurance for the acquiring bank against changing buying rates.

Interchange Plus pricing means that the acquirer charges you a variable MSC consisting of the cost price plus a fixed markup. This MSC will then vary between transactions depending on the characteristics of the transaction such as card type, channel (point of sale, e-commerce or call center) and security measures involved (Card Verification Code, 3-D Secure). This gives merchants insight in the cost of their payment traffic and can also realize a lower total payment cost.

In the US and for corporate merchants, interchange-plus pricing is common practice.

References
Understanding Interchange. Mastercard

Interchange Fees. Visa

Antitrust: Regulation on Interchange Fees. European Union

Credit card terminology